Oe with diaeresis (Ӫ ӫ; italics: Ӫ ӫ) is a letter of the Cyrillic script, used in the Even and Khanty languages. It also used in Northwestern Mari language.

Usage
In the Even language, this letter represents the close-mid front rounded vowel  or the near-close near-front rounded vowel .

In the Khanty language, this letter represents the close-mid central rounded vowel  or the open-mid central rounded vowel .

Computing codes

See also
 Ө ө : Cyrillic letter Oe
 Ö ö : Latin letter Ö

Cyrillic letters with diacritics
Letters with diaeresis